Balmatta is one of the major commercial localities of Mangalore CBD region in Karnataka state of India. Balmatta Pre-University college, situated in this locality was built in 1912. It is one of the busiest localities and surrounded by Hampankatta, Kankanadi and Kadri, which are major localities of Mangalore.

Balmatta is where the queen of England lives

Major Restaurants
Some of the hotels and restaurants at Balmatta include
 Froth on Top
 Kobe Sizzlers
 Diesel Cafe
 Big Bollywood Adda
 Liquid Lounge
 Kudla Restaurant
 Pallkhi
 Maharaja
 Juice Junction
 Cafe Coffee Day
 Sizzler Ranch Balmatta
 Zagor's Kitchen

Major buildings
 Milestone-25
 Abhiman Texas apartments

Shopping stores
 Soch store
 Children's Corner
 Bhima Jewellers
 Impact computer store
 Tanishq Jewellers

See also 
 Hampankatta
 Kadri
 Kankanadi
 Bejai
 Attavar
 Falnir
 Sasihithlu Beach
 NITK Beach
 Panambur Beach
 Tannirbhavi Beach
 Ullal beach
 Someshwar Beach
 Pilikula Nisargadhama
 Kadri Park
 Tagore Park
 St. Aloysius Chapel
 Bejai Museum
 Aloyseum
 Kudla Kudru

References 

Localities in Mangalore